The legislative districts of Marikina are the representations of the highly urbanized city of Marikina in the various national and local legislatures of the Philippines. At present, the province is represented in the House of Representatives of the Philippines by its two congressional districts, with the districts' representatives being elected every three years. The congressional districts are coextensive with the city's councilor districts, which each elect eight members to the Marikina City Council, creating a total of sixteen elective seats in the legislature.

History 
Marikina was first represented as part of the at-large district of the province of Manila in the Malolos Congress from 1898 to 1899. The then-town was later incorporated to the province of Rizal, established in 1901, and was represented as part of the second district of Rizal from 1907 to 1941 and from 1945 to 1972. During World War II, the then-town was represented as part of the at-large district of Rizal in the National Assembly of the Second Philippine Republic from 1943 to 1944. From 1916 to 1935, Marikina was also represented in the Senate of the Philippines as part of the 4th district. Since the abolition of the abolition of the Senate in 1935 and the subsequent restoration of the bicameral congress, senators have been elected at-large. It was part of the representation of Region IV in the Interim Batasang Pambansa from 1978 to 1984. It was grouped with Pasig from 1984 to 1986 for representation in the Regular Batasang Pambansa, as part of the Legislative district of Pasig–Marikina. Marikina was given its own representation in the restored House of Representatives in 1987, and was divided into two districts after an amendment (Republic Act No. 9364) to its city charter (Republic Act No. 8223) was approved on December 15, 2006.

Current districts 
The city was last redistricted in 2007, where the at-large district was split into the first and second districts. The city's current congressional delegation composes of a member of the Liberal Party and a member of the United Nationalist Alliance (UNA). Both members are part of the majority bloc in the 19th Congress. In the city council, the first district is represented by eight members of the UNA; the second district is represented by six members of the UNA and two members of the Liberal Party.

Historical and defunct district boundaries

See also 
Legislative districts of Rizal
Legislative district of Pasig–Marikina

References 

Marikina
Marikina
Politics of Marikina